Elections to provincial, municipal, city, county and district people's assemblies were held in North Korea on March 7, 1999.

29,442 provincial, municipal, city, county and district people's assembly deputies were elected.

Voter turnout was reported as 99.9%, with candidates receiving a 100% approval rate.

References

1999 in North Korea
1999 elections in Asia
Local elections in North Korea